Gerald Hussey Buchanan Birrell (30 July 1944 – 23 June 1973) was a British racing driver from Scotland, who was killed in an accident during practice for a Formula Two race at Rouen-Les-Essarts.

Born in Milngavie near Glasgow, Birrell left school when aged 15 to start an apprenticeship with a BMC dealer.    He acquired extensive technical experience working as a race mechanic for his elder brother, Graham Birrell.  After successfully racing a Singer Chamois 998cc Imp to win Scottish Saloon Car Championships, he started serious racing single seaters at the relatively late age of 24.  He began in Formula Vee late in 1967, competing at Ingliston where he led for much of the race before finishing second to Nick Brittan, the leading Formula Vee driver of the time.   He moved south and transferred to  Formula Ford in 1969, racing against drivers such as Emerson Fittipaldi and James Hunt.  He progressed to Formula 3 and Formula 2 in 1970, racing private Brabhams and a Lotus 69.  Birrell was also successful in touring cars, mainly in a Ford Capri - taking a Class win in the 1972 24 Hours of Le Mans.

By 1973 he was being slated to replace his fellow Scot Jackie Stewart at Tyrrell Racing in Formula One.  A promising career was ended when he died of unsurvivable injuries in an accident during qualifying for the F2 Trophee D'Europe race at Rouen when a front tyre failed at the notorious Six Freres corner, Birrell's Chevron B25 being thrown into a poorly secured crash barrier.  The rail was lifted by the force of the crash, the Chevron passed beneath it, and Birrell died from internal injuries.

Sources

1944 births
1973 deaths
Racing drivers who died while racing
Scottish racing drivers
European Formula Two Championship drivers
24 Hours of Le Mans drivers
Sportspeople from Glasgow
Sport deaths in France
People from Milngavie
World Sportscar Championship drivers
Ecurie Ecosse drivers